Betty Elaine Collette (December 5, 1930 – February 5, 2017) was a veterinary pathologist from Asheville, North Carolina. She attended Stephens-Lee High School, earned her bachelor's degree in biology from Morgan State University, and her Ph.D. in bacteriology from Catholic University of America.

Research 
Collette was the only African-American pathology researcher at Georgetown University School of Medicine in the 1950s.

Her research focused on hypertension in animals. Later in her career, she was a professor at Howard University.

References 

American pathologists
Morgan State University alumni
Catholic University of America alumni
Howard University faculty
1930 births
2017 deaths
African-American women physicians
African-American physicians
American women academics
20th-century African-American people
21st-century African-American people
20th-century African-American women
21st-century African-American women